Raw Deal is an out-of-print collectible card game published by Comic Images and licensed from World Wrestling Entertainment. It was released in August 2000. It was designed to replicate the action of a professional wrestling match. The game was designed by Michael Foley and Barron Vangor Toth. On November 14, 2007, Comic Images released a press release stating that they had lost the WWE License due to declining sales. The game ceased production in December 2007.  As of 2008, many of the players banded together to continue the game in what is now called the Virtual era.  To date, 10 Virtual sets have been released, adding over 2,000 new cards to the game.

Game play
The game is intended to be played in a one-on-one or two-on-two setting (a tag team match), but multi-player variants are common and popular. Raw Deal uses a 60-card deck, called "Arsenal". On this deck, players may represent their favorite superstars and moves of professional wrestlers. In addition, Raw Deal uses a 20-card mini deck, called "Backlash Deck". Cards for the game are available in starter decks and booster packs. Expansions were released two to three times a year. Update sets called “Survivor Series” have also been released, which contain the most popular cards from the preceding sets.

Basics of the game
A typical game of Raw Deal can include cards representing everything from the venue in which the match takes place to outside interference in the match. Each player reveals their chosen wrestler (referred to as a Superstar card) before the game commences. Information on the Superstar card is used to determine the number of cards in a player's opening hand (starting hand size) and who will start the game (superstar value). Every superstar card also has a superstar ability, which reflects the wrestler's in-ring attributes and often forms the basis of the deck.

Some superstar cards are referred to as “remakes”. This is because they represent the same WWE persona as an existing superstar card, but with a different title, hand size, superstar value and ability. They also do not count as the same superstar as the original superstar card for that WWE performer, as they are conceptually distinct and are often played quite differently.

Almost every card other than Superstar cards has two values on it: Fortitude, and Damage. Fortitude represents the courage or strength of mind of the Superstar, while Damage is the amount of punishment that a Superstar deals to an opponent.

Winning the game
A player wins the game in one of two ways:

Pinfall: a player inflicts enough Damage that their opponent has to overturn more cards than remain in their Arsenal.

Count-Out: an opponent ends any turn with no cards left in their Arsenal. A player may elect to refuse a count-out and go for a pin, if they want to prevent their opponent from deliberately “counting themselves out”.

Card types
At a basic level, the cards in any Raw Deal deck will be of the following types:

Maneuvers (yellow): in most decks, maneuvers are the means by which players inflict damage on their opponents and gain Fortitude. There are ten main types of maneuver - strikes, grapples, submissions, high risks, trademark finishers, assaults, holds, throws, trademarks, and extremes. Maneuvers can only be played on a player's turn.

Reversals (red): these cards are used to stop an opponent's maneuver or action cards. They typically stop a specific type of card, although some will reverse any card.  Unless stated otherwise, Reversals will work when played from a player's hand, or when overturned while taking damage. Reversals can only be played on the opponent's turn unless the card states otherwise, and will end an opponent's turn when played or overturned.

Actions (blue): these cards represent different antics in and out of the squared circle. Their effects can range from allowing a player to draw cards or recovering cards in the Ringside pile, to removing cards from an opponent's Ring area or even immediately winning the game. Actions can only be played on a player's turn.

Antics (green): much like actions, these cards represent any side action taken by the wrestler during the match.  They serve almost identical functions to actions.

Hybrids: hybrid cards are multicoloured, and can be used for either purpose. Hybrid actions and maneuvers can only be played on a player's turn, while hybrid reversals can only be played on an opponent's turn.

Superstar-specifics: these can be any of the other types of cards, and represent the trademark actions of WWE wrestlers. These cards have a logo denoting which superstar(s) may use the card, and are usually the most powerful cards in any player's deck.

“Remake” superstars are always capable of playing most or all cards with the original superstar's logo on them, but do not count as that superstar. The only exceptions to this rule are Bradshaw/JBL because the character changed quite drastically storyline-wise (to the point that he doesn't even acknowledge his former gimmick).

Backlash Deck
The Backlash deck is made up of 20 cards - 10 Pre-Match and 10 Mid-Match cards. These cards have a horizontal orientation. Pre-Match cards are purple-bordered, while Mid-Match cards are actions, maneuvers, reversals or hybrids and have the same color as a card of the same type in a player's Arsenal. Normally, a player can only have 5 Pre-Match and 5 Mid-Match cards in the Ring at any time.

When playing with a Backlash deck, there is a Pre-Match phase in the game. Starting with the player with the higher Superstar Value, players alternate in playing these cards. After all players have played all the Pre-Match cards they can or wish to play, the players resolve their effects, starting with the player who had the highest Superstar Value. There are five stages to the Pre-Match phase:

Venue - locations which provide specific benefits and effects, often to all players.

Feud - feud cards represent rivalries between wrestlers. Many feud cards are superstar-specific, or have additional effects against particular opponents.

Stipulation - the conditions for the match, which include No Disqualification, Hell In A Cell, First Blood, Buried Alive and TLC (Tables, Ladders and Chairs) Matches.

Manager - valets or other individuals accompanying a wrestler to the ring.

Regular - most Pre-Match cards are played in the Regular phase, including Events, Superstar-Specific Storyline Cards, Pay-Per-View Events that represent specific WWE annual pay-per-views and Objects like WWE title belts.

Mid-Match cards can be played whenever it would be legal to play them, as they are actions, maneuvers and reversals. A Mid-Match card is not considered to have been played from a player's hand, but from the player's Backlash deck. Once a player has 5 Mid-Match cards in play, they cannot play any more unless they can increase their legal limit or remove one or more from the Ring.

Backstage Area
This is where a player's superstar card and Backstage Area cards are located. Although these cards are on the table, they are not considered to be “in” the Ring area.  Most Backstage Area cards are superstar-specific and are not particularly powerful, although they are effectively “free” cards and cannot be reversed or removed from play by an opponent. The Enforcer cards for certain superstars (Eric Bischoff, Stephanie McMahon, Paul Heyman, The Mystery Wrestler, Sable, Stacy Keibler, Theodore Long and Bobby “The Brain” Heenan) are also revealed from the Backstage Area.

Tournaments
Raw Deal tournaments are typically singles events rather than tag team tournaments. There are three basic formats for tournaments: All Axxess, Afterburn and Revolution. All Axxess tournaments have no restrictions on the cards or superstars that may be used by players. Afterburn tournaments require a player's deck and superstar to have been from one of the most recent expansions or the latest Survivor Series set. At present, Afterburn-legal cards are limited to card printed or reprinted in Survivor Series 3, as well anything printed after the Vengeance set (Lethal Library, Armageddon, Unforgiven and Royal Rumble sets, as well as some prize support and promotional cards).  Revolution Format is restricted to Revolution Format cards only, and follow the rules of the Revolution game by itself.

Regardless of the format, singles tournaments use a random draw in the first round, and the Swiss pairing system in subsequent rounds, so that players will be facing opponents with roughly similar win–loss records in each round. Players who win a match by Pin receive 3 points, while players who win by Count-Out receive 2 points. The number of rounds depends on the size of the tournament, as does the number of finals positions. In most cases, a 2:1 win-loss ration is typically sufficient to secure a finals berth.

In the event of a points tie for finals placing, the performance of a player's opposition is used to determine who will qualify for the finals. In addition, no more than one player may reach the finals with the same superstar - this is known as the Diversity Rule, and discourages players from all using the same deck. If four players are using the same superstar, only one can make the finals, even if the others would normally qualify. Once the top cut is made at the end of the regular rounds, players play single-elimination rounds until only one player is left as the tournament winner.

Tournament kits and random cards are usually offered as prizes for tournaments. These include title belt cards, guest ringside announcer cards or other unique cards unavailable in starter decks or booster packs. After the tournament, the performance of the players is noted and sent through to update the existing world rankings. The Raw Deal world rankings use the ELO ranking system to determine a player's position.

World qualifiers & the World Championship
The Raw Deal World Championships were held every year in the same city as WWE WrestleMania, on the same weekend as the event. To reach the world championships, a player must have either win a regional qualifier, finish as the number-one ranked player in the world, or be one of the top 50 ranked players and be randomly chosen to attend. World Championship qualifier tournaments typically attracted much larger numbers and considerably greater amounts of prize support than a normal tournament, although they were conducted in exactly the same way. The winner received a trip to the World Championships in addition to any other prize support.

When the Raw Deal Player's Committee started running the World Championships in 2008, they were held every year in Indianapolis, Indiana at Gen Con.  Players still had to qualify to participate in the Championships.  In 2013, this was changed to an Open Championship format, where any player who showed up to the event was allowed to participate.

World Championship
2007 - Mohd Rumi Bin Mohd
2006 - James Kandziolka
2005 - Frankie Ho
2004 - Wes Victory
2003 - Bryan Witte
2002 - Mike Canu

Virtual Era World Championship
2019 - Scott Mackie
2018 - Scott Hulett
2017 - Mitchel Friederick
2016 - John Polverino
2015 - Chad Gropack
2014 - Mitchel Friederick
2013 - John Polverino
2012 - Gilbert Marquez
2011 - Gilbert Marquez
2010 - Justin Meyers
2009 - Eric Velasquez
2008 - Ric Pittman

Products
The first 20 sets of WWE Raw Deal cards were released from August 2000 to August 2006.

Premiere Edition
Starter Deck Superstars: 
The Rock 
"Stone Cold" Steve Austin
The Undertaker
Mankind
Triple H
Chris Jericho
Kane

Fully Loaded
Starter Deck Superstars: 
Kurt Angle
Chris Benoit
Chyna
Eddie Guerrero
Rikishi
Tazz
Booster Pack Superstars: 
Road Dogg 
X-Pac 
Billy Gunn

Backlash
Starter Deck Superstars:  Hardy Boyz
Dudley Boyz
Edge and Christian
RTC
Booster Pack Superstars:
Matt Hardy
Jeff Hardy
D-von Dudley
Bubba Ray Dudley
Edge
Christian

Survivor Series
Starter Deck Superstars:

NEW:
Deadman Inc.
Cactus Jack

REMAKE: 
Chris Benoit("Technically The Best" Edition)
Tazz ("Survive If I Let You" Edition)
Kane ("From The Hellfire" Edition)
Chris Jericho ("Raw Deal Is Jericho" Edition)
Triple H ("Game Over?" Edition)
The Rock ("Just Bring It!" Edition)
"Stone Cold" Steve Austin ("Ragin' Redneck" Edition)
Kurt Angle ("Red, White And True!" Edition)

Mania
Starter Deck Superstars: 
Lita
Rob Van Dam
The Big Show
Booker T
Booster Pack Superstars: 
Spike Dudley
William Regal
APA 
Raven

Summerslam
Starter Deck Superstars: 
Hollywood Hulk Hogan
Ric Flair
Trish Stratus
Hall 'n' Nash
Booster Pack Superstars: 
Tajiri
The Hurricane
Billy and Chuck 
Al Snow

Velocity
Starter Deck Superstars: 
The People's Champion (The Rock) 
The Game (Triple H)
The Big Freakin' Machine (Kane)
Rey Mysterio
Brock Lesnar
Goldust
Booster Pack Superstars: 
Jamie Noble 
Three Minute Warning

Survivor Series 2
Starter Deck Superstars:
NEW: 
Dude Love
 REMAKE: 
Trish Stratus ("The Dish" Edition)
Booker T ("B-Tizzy" Edition)
Edge ("You'll Never Know Me" Edition)
Christian ("At Last I'm On My Own" Edition)
Big Show ("Mountain Of A Man" Edition)
Eddie Guerrero (“Feel The Heat” Edition)
Rob Van Dam 
Lita
Jeff Hardy
Matt Hardy
Chris Jericho
Booster Pack Superstars
Triple H
The Rock
Kane
Hollywood Hulk Hogan
Ric Flair
Kurt Angle
Rikishi
Tazz
Dudley Boyz
D-von Dudley
Buh Buh Ray Dudley
Spike Dudley
William Regal
Tajiri
The Hurricane
Al Snow

Insurrextion
Starter Deck Superstars: 
Big Poppa Pump
Shawn Michaels 
Team Angle (Charlie Hass & Shelton Benjamin)
Los Guerreros (Eddie & Chavo Guerrero)
The Crippler (Chris Benoit)
The Rattlesnake ("Stone Cold" Steve Austin)
Booster Pack Superstars: 
Test
Rhyno

Divas Overload
Starter Deck Superstars: 
Goldberg
John Cena
Torrie Wilson
Stacy Keibler
Gail Kim & Molly Holly
Sable
Booster Pack Superstars:
Victoria
Nidia

Vengeance
Starter Deck Superstars: 
The Highlight of the Night (Chris Jericho)
Evolution
The Mystery Wrestler (Mankind, Dude Love, or Cactus Jack)
The Leader of the Edge Army (Edge)
Paul Heyman
Your Freaking Hero (Kurt Angle)
Booster Pack Superstars: 
FBI 
A-Train

Armageddon
Starter Deck Superstar: 
J.B.L.
Shelton Benjamin
Randy Orton
The Babe of the Year (Trish Stratus) 
The Phenom (Undertaker)
Shane O'Mac
Booster Pack Superstars: 
Eugene 
Rene Dupree

Survivor Series 3
Rumble packs 1-12

Unforgiven
Starter Deck Superstars: 
Batista 
The Leader of the Peepulation (Christian)
Christy
The Immortal One (Hogan, legend super star)
“Rowdy” Roddy Piper (Legend super star)
SmackDown! GM Theodore Long
Booster Pack Superstars: 
Heidenreich
Gene Snitsky
MNM 
The Hurri-friends

Royal Rumble
Booster Pack Superstars (no Starter Decks in this expansion):
“Hollywood” Hulk Hogan
Sgt. Slaughter
The Home Team (John Cena, Matt Hardy, RVD, & The Big Show)
The Heat Seekers (Carlito, The Mexicools, William Regal, & Tajiri)

No Way Out
Starter Deck Superstars: 
Jake “the Snake” (Legends Superstar)
“The Million Dollar Man” Ted DiBiase (Legends Superstar)
Carlito
The Bookerman (Booker T)
The Largest Athlete in Sports Entertainment (Big Show)
X-treme Diva (Lita)
Booster Pack Superstars: 
Chavo Guerrero
Funaki
The Mexicools
Viscera

Great American Bash
Starter Deck Superstars:  
Andre “The Giant” (Legends Superstar)
Lashley
Ken Kennedy
Mickie James
Mr. Pay-Per-View (Rob Van Dam)
The Ultimate Survivor (Matt Hardy) 
Booster Pack Superstars: 
The Boogeyman
The Spirit Squad (w/ 5 individual members)

Revolution
Starter Deck Superstars:  
Revolution John Cena
Revolution Triple H
Revolution Batista
Revolution Rey Mysterio

Revolution 2 Extreme
Starter Deck Superstars:  
Revolution Edge
Revolution Randy Orton
Revolution Jeff Hardy
Revolution Kane

Revolution 3: Judgement Day
Starter Deck Superstars:  
Revolution Stone Cold Steve Austin 
Revolution Undertaker  
Revolution Shawn Michaels  
Revolution Ric Flair 
Revolution Umaga  
Revolution The Great Khali

Further reading
Strategy in Scrye #52
Strategy in Scrye #68

References

Sets 1-20 card listing

External links

World Wrestling Entertainment website
Team Canada Online

Raw Deal deck builder 

Card games introduced in 2000
Collectible card games
Professional wrestling games
WWE